Zenith is an unincorporated community in Monroe County, West Virginia, United States. Zenith is located near the Virginia border, south of Union.

The community's name is said to be biblical in origin.

References

Unincorporated communities in Monroe County, West Virginia
Unincorporated communities in West Virginia